Aellopos ceculus is a moth of the  family Sphingidae.

Distribution 
It lives mainly in the northern section of South America but has known to be found as far north as Mexico.

Description 
The wingspan is 42–47 mm. It can be distinguished from all other Aellopos species by the yellow median band found on the hindwing upperside.

Biology 
Adults are on wing year round in Costa Rica. There are probably three main generations, with adults on wing from December to January, April to May and in September.

The larvae feed on various Rubiaceae species.

References

Aellopos
Moths described in 1777
Sphingidae of South America
Moths of North America
Taxa named by Pieter Cramer